Alexandria Airport  is a public use airport located three nautical miles (6 km) southeast of the central business district of Alexandria, a city in Madison County, Indiana, United States.

History
Alexandria airport was started as a privately owned - public use airport in a field. In 2004, the 40-year-old Central Indiana Soaring Society rebased from Indianapolis Executive Airport. In 2007, the club rezoned the land for an airport, and purchased the airfield for its use.

Facilities and aircraft 
It has one runway designated 9/27 with an asphalt surface measuring 2,591 by 60 feet (790 x 18 m).

For the 12-month period ending May 2, 2005, the airport had 7,074 general aviation aircraft operations, an average of 19 per day. At that time there were 18 aircraft based at this airport: 11% single-engine and 89% glider.

References

External links 
 Central Indiana Soaring Society
 Aerial photo from Indiana DOT
 Aerial image as of 5 April 1998 from USGS The National Map
 
 

Airports in Indiana
Transportation buildings and structures in Madison County, Indiana